Khalid Al-Shaibani (Arabic:خالد الشيباني) (born 31 July 1997) is an Emirati footballer who plays for Al-Arabi as a midfielder, most recently for Al-Wasl.

Career
Al-Shaibani started his career at Al-Wasl and is a product of the Al-Wasl's youth system. On 17 March 2018, Al-Shaibani made his professional debut for Al-Wasl against Al Dhafra in the Pro League, replacing Anthony Caceres .

References

External links
 

1997 births
Living people
Emirati footballers
Al-Wasl F.C. players
Al Hamriyah Club players
Al-Arabi SC (UAE) players
UAE Pro League players
UAE First Division League players
Association football midfielders
Place of birth missing (living people)